Thomas Cranley Onslow (7 October 1778 – 7 July 1861), of Stoke Park, Guildford, and Upton House, Hampshire, was a British politician and British Army officer, the second son of Thomas Onslow, 2nd Earl of Onslow.

He married Susannah Elizabeth Hillier (died 26 March 1852), coheiress of Nathaniel Hiller of Stoke Park, on 28 May 1813, and they had several children:
George Augustus Cranley Onslow (1813–1855), married Mary Harriet Anne Loftus in 1848, father of William Onslow, 4th Earl of Onslow
Guildford James Hillier Onslow (1814–1882), later Mainwaring-Ellerker-Onslow, married his distant cousin Rosa Anna Onslow in 1838
Lt-Col. Arthur Edward Onslow (1815–1897), later Mainwaring-Ellerker-Onslow, married Margaret Anne Ferrers in 1846 and had issue
Thomas Frederick Onslow (15 January 1821 – 15 July 1883)
Charles? Townshend Onslow (30 May 1822 – 28 February 1823)
Susannah Augusta Arabella Onslow (8 November 1816 – 12 June 1899)
Elizabeth Harriet Onslow (17 October 1817 – 19 July 1824)
Harriet Charlotte Matilda Onslow (20 April 1826 – 11 July 1885)

Onslow served in the Scots Fusilier Guards, rising to the rank of lieutenant colonel. He was posted to the Cadiz garrison as a captain in 1810. On 15 March 1812, he succeeded his father as Colonel of the 2nd Royal Surrey Militia, a position he held until his resignation on 14 August 1852.

Notes

References
Burke's Peerage and Baronetage
 Capt John Davis, Historical Records of the Second Royal Surrey or Eleventh Regiment of Militia, London: Marcus Ward, 1877.

External links 
 
 Queen's Royal Surreys

1778 births
1861 deaths
Members of the Parliament of the United Kingdom for English constituencies
Scots Guards officers
UK MPs 1806–1807
UK MPs 1807–1812
UK MPs 1812–1818
Younger sons of earls
British Militia officers
Surrey Militia officers
Thomas Cranley